The Smith and Wesson 459 is an updated version of the Model 59 with adjustable sights and checkered nylon grips. It was created for the US XM9 Pistol trials. It was a 9mm double/single action handgun with locked breech short recoil action.

This handgun did not complete the test and so was not considered. Testing procedures are discussed in the book Future Weapons. and also at Firearms Radio XM9 Testing

This model was discontinued in 1988. 803 units were produced in a brush finish with special grips made to FBI specifications.

Users 
: Used by the Federal Bureau of Investigation.

References

Trial and research firearms of the United States
9mm Parabellum semi-automatic pistols
Smith & Wesson semi-automatic pistols
Semi-automatic pistols of the United States